Emmett Miller (February 2, 1900 – March 29, 1962) was an American minstrel show performer and recording artist known for his falsetto, yodel-like voice. Miller was a major influence on many country music singers, including Hank Williams, Jimmie Rodgers, Bob Wills, Milton Brown, Tommy Duncan, and Merle Haggard. His music provides a link among old-time Southern music, minstrelsy, jazz, and Western swing.

Life
Miller was born on February 2, 1900, in Macon, Georgia. His early life is largely undocumented, but it generally is acknowledged that he was performing in minstrel shows by the time he was in his early 20s. His first recordings were released by Okeh Records in 1924. His backup group, the Georgia Crackers, included in the 1930s the noted jazz musicians Tommy Dorsey, Jimmy Dorsey, Gene Krupa, and Eddie Lang. Miller continued to perform in minstrel shows until he was well into his 50s, long after they had fallen out of fashion. He returned to Macon, where he died in 1962. He was buried in Fort Hill Cemetery.

Legacy
Miller's influence on early country music is most apparent in Hank Williams's cover of the 1922 Friend–Mills song "Lovesick Blues" and Bob Wills's recording of "I Ain't Got Nobody", both of which closely resemble Miller's versions, and George Strait's Western Swing cover of "Right or Wrong". Merle Haggard, Van Dyke Parks, Ry Cooder, Leon Redbone, Louis Prima, Van Halen and their frontman David Lee Roth have recorded Miller's songs.

"Emmett Miller: An Obscure Minstrel Yodeler Who Changed Music Forever", a biography from author/filmmaker Jack Norton, has been an Amazon best-seller.

Sources

References

External links
Profile on Red Hot Jazz (includes numerous audio files)
[ Emmett Miller entry on Allmusic]
Emmett Miller on Myspace

Blackface minstrel performers
1900 births
1962 deaths
Yodelers
Vaudeville performers
Musicians from Macon, Georgia
20th-century American singers
20th-century American male singers